Thomas H. DeBlois (born April 22, 1945) is an American politician who formerly served as a member of the New Hampshire Senate for the 18th district. A member of the Republican Party, he was elected in 2010, defeating incumbent Betsi DeVries. In 2012, he decided not to seek a second term and, instead, ran for the 4th district seat on the Executive Council of New Hampshire, narrowly losing the Republican nomination.

Electoral history

References

External links
Project Vote Smart profile
Twitter account

Living people
1945 births
Republican Party New Hampshire state senators
University of New Hampshire alumni
21st-century American politicians